Semioptila papilionaria is a moth in the Himantopteridae family. It was described by Francis Walker in 1864. It is found in Africa.

References

Moths described in 1864
Himantopteridae